William Elko (born December 28, 1959) is a former American football lineman who played three seasons in the National Football League (NFL) with the San Diego Chargers and Indianapolis Colts. He was drafted by the Chargers in the seventh round of the 1983 NFL Draft. Elko first attended Arizona State University before transferring to play college football at Louisiana State University. He attended Windber High School in Windber, Pennsylvania.

References

External links
Just Sports Stats

Living people
1959 births
American football defensive tackles
American football offensive guards
Arizona State Sun Devils football players
LSU Tigers football players
San Diego Chargers players
Indianapolis Colts players
Players of American football from New York City
People from Windber, Pennsylvania
National Football League replacement players